Kathryn Winter is a British ice dancer. She won the 1976 World Junior Figure Skating Championships in ice dancing with partner Nicholas Slater.

References

  

Year of birth missing (living people)
British female ice dancers
Living people
World Junior Figure Skating Championships medalists